Miguel Ángel Gómez Campuzano (24 April 1968 – 6 April 1993) was a Spanish sprinter who competed primarily in the 200 metres. He represented his country at the 1992 Summer Olympics. In addition he reached the final at the 1991 World Indoor Championships.

He died in a motorcycle accident together with his girlfriend in 1993.

Competition record

Personal bests
Outdoor
200 metres – 20.76 (-1.0 m/s, Athens 1991)
Indoor
200 metres – 21.09 (Seville 1991)

References

All-Athletics profile

1968 births
1993 deaths
Spanish male sprinters
Sportspeople from Seville
Olympic athletes of Spain
Athletes (track and field) at the 1992 Summer Olympics
World Athletics Championships athletes for Spain
Mediterranean Games silver medalists for Spain
Mediterranean Games medalists in athletics
Athletes (track and field) at the 1991 Mediterranean Games
Road incident deaths in Spain